The Sun Rises in the East is the debut album by American hip hop rapper Jeru the Damaja, released May 24, 1994 on Payday Records. Production on the album was handled by DJ Premier. The album features fellow Gang Starr Foundation member Afu-Ra. The album cover depicts the World Trade Center on fire only one year after the 1993 bombing of the North Tower.

The Sun Rises in the East was well received by most music critics upon its release. It is considerably significant in hip hop, as it contributed to the revival of the East Coast hip hop scene, along with albums such as Wu-Tang Clan's Enter the Wu-Tang (36 Chambers) (1993), Nas's Illmatic (1994), Big L's   Lifestylez ov da Poor & Dangerous (1995), Notorious BIG's Ready to Die (1994), Onyx's Bacdafucup (1993), Smif-N-Wessun's Dah Shinin (1995) and Black Moon's Enta da Stage (1993). The album has been considered by critics to be Jeru the Damaja's best work.

Reception

Melody Maker named The Sun Rises in the East "bloody essential", calling it "hypnotic and chilling as a blues party on Pluto" and "another step forward for hip hop." NME said that "Jeru is more original than most [rappers]", while The Source remarked that "the music both contrasts and complements his disjointed flow and deep poetical lyricism."

Track listing
All songs produced by DJ Premier

Singles

Chart history

Weekly charts

Year-end charts

Singles

In popular culture
"D. Original" is featured on the GTA IV Soundtrack and can be listened to on the radio station 104.1 The Classics hosted by DJ Premier. Unlike the other stations featured in the game, "The Classics" has one continuous mix of all songs featuring smooth transitions from every song to the next and so a slightly different version, exclusive to the game, can be heard there.

"You Can't Stop the Prophet" is featured on the soundtrack of the video game NBA 2K16. The soundtrack was partially curated by DJ Premier.

References

External links
 The Sun Rises in the East at Discogs
 Retrospect for Hip-Hop: A Golden Age on Record?

1994 debut albums
Jeru the Damaja albums
Albums produced by DJ Premier
FFRR Records albums